Louis C. "Pete" Butler (1909 – January 26, 1983) was an American football, basketball, and baseball coach and college athletics administrator.  He served as the head baseball coach at Colorado State College of Education—now known as the University of Northern Colorado—from  1941 to 1967, compiling a record of 416–154–2.  Butler was also the school's head basketball coach from 1940 to 1943 and again from 1945 to 1956, tally mark of 151–133.  His baseball teams won 25 consecutive Rocky Mountain Athletic Conference championships.

Head coaching record

Baseball

References

1909 births
1983 deaths
New Mexico Mines Miners athletic directors
New Mexico Mines Miners men's basketball coaches
Northern Colorado Bears baseball coaches
Northern Colorado Bears baseball players
Northern Colorado Bears football coaches
Northern Colorado Bears men's basketball coaches